is a public junior college in Niimi, Okayama, Japan. It opened in 1980 as a women's junior college, and became coeducational in 1999. Departments include Early Childhood Education, Nursing and Community Welfare.

Location
Niimi College is located in northwest Niimi, Okayama, Japan, nearby the Takahashi River.

See also 
 List of junior colleges in Japan

External links
 

Public universities in Japan
Japanese junior colleges
Universities and colleges in Okayama Prefecture